Global Ecology and Biogeography is a bimonthly peer-reviewed scientific journal that was established in 1991. It covers research in the field of macroecology. The current editor-in-chief is Brian McGill. According to its publisher, Wiley, the journal has an impact factor of 5.667, and in 2018 it was ranked 17/165 journals in "Ecology," and 2/50 in "Geography, Physical" by the ISI Journal Citation Reports Ranking: https://onlinelibrary.wiley.com/journal/14668238

External links 
 

Bimonthly journals
Publications established in 1993
English-language journals